Ziran or tzu-jan is a key concept in Daoism that literally means "of its own; by itself" and thus "naturally; natural; spontaneously; freely; in the course of events; of course; doubtlessly". This Chinese word is a two-character compound of zi "nose; self; oneself; from; since" and ran "right; correct; so; yes", which is used as a -ran suffix marking adjectives or adverbs (roughly corresponding to English -ly). In Chinese culture, the nose (or zi) is a common metaphor for a person's point of view.

Origin
The word 'ziran' first occurs in the Daodejing (17, 23, 25, 51, 64) and refers to the structure of Dao, which cannot be referred back to anything else. It is generally accepted that the philosopher Laozi, author of the Daodejing, coined the term. Ziran is a central concept of Daoism, closely tied to the practice of wuwei, detached or effortless action. Ziran refers to a state of "as-it-isness," the most important quality for anyone following Daoist beliefs. To become nearer to a state of ziran, one must become separate from unnatural influences and return to an entirely natural, spontaneous state. Ziran is related to developing an "altered sense of human nature and of nature per se". When it comes to sensibility of Taoism, the moral import can be most found in ziran.

Contemporary reinterpretation
Ziran has been interpreted and reinterpreted in a great number of ways over time. Most commonly it has been seen as a model that was followed by the Dao, Heaven, Earth, and Man in turn, based on the traditional translation and interpretation of Chapter 25 of the Daodejing. Qingjie James Wang's more modern translation eliminates the logical flaw that arises when one considers that to model oneself after another entity may be to become less natural, to lose the 'as-it-isness' that ziran refers to. Wang reinterprets the words of Chapter 25 to be instructions to follow the model set by Earth's being Earth, by Heaven's being Heaven, and by the Dao being the Dao; each behaving perfectly in accordance with ziran. This interpretation reaffirms that the base nature of the Dao is one of complete naturalness.

Wing-Chuek Chan provides another translation of 'ziran': "It is so by virtue of its own". This brings up ziran's link to another Daoist belief, specifically that the myriad things exist because of the qualities that they possess, not because they were created by any being to fulfill a purpose or goal. The only thing that a being must be when it exists in accordance with ziran is ultimately natural, unaffected by artificial influences.

Ziran and Tianran are related concepts. Tianran refers to a thing created by heaven that is ultimately untouched by human influence, a thing fully characterized by ziran. The two terms are sometimes interchangeably used. It can be said that by gaining ziran, a person grows nearer to a state of tianran.

Ziran can also be looked at from under Buddha's influence, "non-substantial". It is then believed to mean 'having no nature of its own'. In this aspect it is seen as a synonym of real emptiness.

D. T. Suzuki, in a brief article penned in 1959, makes the suggestion of ziran as an aesthetic of action: "Living is an act of creativity demonstrating itself. Creativity is objectively seen as necessity, but from the inner point of view of Emptiness it is 'just-so-ness,' (ziran). It literally means 'byitself-so-ness,' implying more inner meaning than 'spontaneity' or 'naturalness'".

See also
 Pu (Daoism), a metaphor for naturalness
 Tathātā or "suchness" in Mahayana Buddhism
 Sahaja, "coemergent; spontaneously or naturally born together" in Indian and Tibetan Buddhism

References

Further reading
 

Taoist philosophy
Conceptions of self
Point of view